Toni Pitoška (born 24 July 1982) is a Macedonian retired footballer who last played as a forward for FK Pelister in the Macedonian First League.

External links

Profile at PlayerHistory 
Football Federation of Macedonia
Macedonian Football

1982 births
Living people
Association football forwards
Macedonian footballers
FK Pelister players
PFC Marek Dupnitsa players
Macedonian First Football League players
Macedonian Second Football League players
First Professional Football League (Bulgaria) players
Macedonian expatriate footballers
Expatriate footballers in Bulgaria
Macedonian expatriate sportspeople in Bulgaria